Sutarmidji (born 29 January 1962) is an Indonesian politician and academician who is the 9th governor of West Kalimantan and formerly the mayor of its capital, Pontianak.

Starting his political career in 1981, he taught at Tanjungpura University, became a member of Pontianak's city council and served as deputy mayor before elected mayor in 2008 and again in 2013.

Background
Sutarmidji was born in Pontianak on 29 January 1962. He was the sixth child of nine, and his parents' names were Tahir Abubakar and Djaedah. His father used to be active in Masyumi and had worked in the Ministry of Religious Affairs. As a child, he used to be a newspaper hawker close to the mayor's office.

He completed his first 12 years of education all in Pontianak - at publicly operated SDN 54 (class of 1974) and SMPN 1 (class of 1977) for primary and middle school, and the Catholic high school SMA Santo Paulus (class of 1981). He continued his education, receiving a bachelor's degree in law from Tanjungpura University in 1986, and later a master's degree in humanities from University of Indonesia in 1993.

Career
After earning his bachelor's degree, Sutarmidji began to work at Tanjungpura University as a lecturer in its faculty of law, a position he held between 1987 and 2000.

In Pontianak
Sutarmidji's work in politics began after he graduated from highschool in 1981, when he joined the United Development Party. In 1997, he was elected into the Pontianak City Council, despite both being a civil servant and not being a member of Golkar (membership of which was enforced for civil servants during the New Order). After the 1999 elections, he remained a member of the City Council. Later he served as deputy mayor under Buchary Abdurrachman. After winning the mayoral election of 2008 with 85,340 votes (34.47%), Sutarmidji was sworn in as mayor on 22 December 2008. Sutarmidji won his reelection in 2013, securing 139,061 votes (51.71%) in the six-candidate race while winning in all of Pontianak's subdistricts.

During his terms, he cut down on bureaucratic red tape by reducing the number of permits required and shortening the application process. The city's government also composed standard operating procedures for various tasks. He claimed that his changes were the cause of the increase in the city's annual income, from Rp 65 billion to 960 billion between 2009 and 2015. In healthcare, he abolished service tiers in the city's main public hospital, and established feeding centers for undernourished children. His budget-forming method, which involved a public announcement of the city's annual budget to the public for appraisal before assessment by the city council, was also praised by Indonesia Corruption Watch observers.

His tenure also saw city-funded renovation of traditional markets and houses in poor condition, enlargement of the city's roads and the establishment of two public parks for the city's inhabitants. The city also developed several tools in cooperation with startups and the private sector, including an application tracking pollution and tree locations called "SIPPohon" in October 2016. As Pontianak suffered from haze due to forest fires, the application was intended to allow residents to track the pollution levels and information on existing trees, including their size and carbon absorption capability. The city government intended to use the information to determine the location and quantity of vegetation needed to improve air quality. In addition, the city's government also released a native payment app called GencilPay (which is similar to China's Alipay) and a complaints app. With the GencilPay application, Pontianak residents could monitor the prices of groceries in the city's markets. The applications, and their use by the city government, won Smart City awards from the Bandung Institute of Technology in 2017.

In 2017, the Ministry of Home Affairs named him one of the best mayors in Indonesia, alongside Bandung mayor Ridwan Kamil and Surabaya mayor Tri Rismaharini. Pontianak was also named the city with the best public service in the country by the Indonesian Ombudsman in 2015. The city received a total of 231 awards from various organizations under his ten-year tenure.

As governor
Following the 2018 gubernatorial election, Sutarmidji defeated two other candidates, winning 1,334,512 votes (51.55%). He was sworn in on 5 September 2018. He promised that he would carry over his system from Pontianak in order to establish budget transparency in the province, while also demanding explanations for a Rp 600 billion (US$41 million) deficit in the 2018 provincial budget. By 20 September, he had removed the provincial secretary from his post, with the secretary having stated that he would not serve in his position if Sutarmidji was to become governor.

Personal life
Sutarmidji is married to Lismaryani, and the couple have three children.

References

Further reading
Nur Iskandar, Walikota Sutarmidji: Bukan Pemimpin Biasa, Top Indonesia, 2012. A biography in Indonesian.

1962 births
Living people
Mayors and regents of places in West Kalimantan
People from Pontianak
United Development Party politicians
Governors of West Kalimantan
Members of Indonesian city councils
Indonesian people of Malay descent
Indonesian Muslims
Politicians from West Kalimantan
Mayors of places in Indonesia